Stockwell, originally named Lauramie, is a census-designated place in Lauramie Township, Tippecanoe County, in the U.S. state of Indiana. It was once a stop along the Indianapolis, Cincinnati and Lafayette Railroad, but the rail line has since been removed.

The community is part of the Lafayette, Indiana Metropolitan Statistical Area.

History
An old variant name of the community was called Bakers Corner.

A post office was established under the name Bakers Corners in 1853, and was renamed to Stockwell in 1859. It is still currently in operation.

Geography 
The town is on a bend in Lauramie Creek in Lauramie Township, less than two miles west of U.S. Route 52. Stockwell had a population of 545 at the 2010 census.

Demographics

References

Census-designated places in Tippecanoe County, Indiana
Census-designated places in Indiana
Lafayette metropolitan area, Indiana